Phantom train may refer to:
Phantom trains, an alternative name for Holocaust trains, used to transport Jews to Nazi concentration and extermination camps

Entertainment
"Phantom Train", a track from Music from FFV and FFVI Video Games, a Final Fantasy compilation album
The Phantom Train, international title of Trenul fantomă, a 1933 Romanian film
Yōkai Express! The Phantom Train, a GeGeGe no Kitarō film

See also
Death train (disambiguation)
Ghost train (disambiguation)
Haunted Train (disambiguation)